Unseo-dong is neighbourhood of Jung District, Incheon, South Korea. The name Unseo was adopted in 1914 when the administrative district was consolidated.

Unseo-dong is the main point of air transportation with Incheon International Airport, which is the gateway to South Korea, and there are many floating populations going to and from the airport and other regions which is growing. However, due to rapid development, various problems such as environmental problems, rich and poor problems, and increased demand for welfare are occurring together.

Transportation 
 Incheon International Airport
 AREX
 Unseo station-Incheon International Airport Cargo Terminal station-Incheon International Airport Terminal 1 station-Yongyu station
 Incheon Airport Maglev

References

Jung District, Incheon
Neighbourhoods in Incheon